Giorgio Zancanaro (born 9 May 1939) is an Italian baritone, particularly associated with the Italian repertory, especially Verdi.

He studied in his native Verona with Maria Palanda, and was revealed at the Verdi Competition in Busseto in 1969. He made his official operatic debut the following year in Mantua, as Riccardo in I puritani. Quickly invited to sing at all the major opera houses of Italy, establishing himself as the eminent "Verdi baritone" of his generation, notably in I masnadieri, Luisa Miller, La traviata. He made his debut at La Scala in 1982, as Ford in Falstaff, and took part in important revivals of Attila and I vespri siciliani, under Riccardo Muti.

On the international scene, he appeared in London, Paris, Zurich, Vienna, Barcelona, Lisbon, Caracas, etc. He also sang at the festivals of Orange, in 1982, as Posa in Don Carlo, and Bregenz, in 1985, as Riccardo in I puritani, opposite Edita Gruberova and Salvatore Fisichella.

He made his debut at the Metropolitan Opera, in 1982, as Renato in Un ballo in maschera, considered one of his best roles. He also appeared at the San Francisco Opera and the Dallas Opera.

Zancanaro sang almost every major baritone role of the Italian repertory, but remained incomparable in Verdi roles, in which, his beautiful and evenly produced voice, brilliant upper register, and stylish singing, are shown to best effect. Unfortunately he was largely ignored by the recording companies. All the same, he can be heard and/or seen in the following official recordings:

Il cappello di paglia di Firenze with Ugo Benelli, Alfredo Mariotti, Viorica Cortez, Daniela Mazzucato RCA 1975
Il trovatore (video) with Raina Kabaivanska, Franco Bonisolli, Giancarlo Luccardi, dir. Bruno Bartoletti Eurodisc 1975
Il trovatore with Plácido Domingo, Rosalind Plowright, Brigitte Fassbaender, Evgeny Nesterenko, dir. Carlo Maria Giulini DG 1983
Don Carlo (DVD) with Luis Lima, Ileana Cotrubas, Robert Lloyd, Bruna Baglioni, dir. Bernard Haitink Castle Vision 1985
Andrea Chenier with Plácido Domingo, Anna Tomowa-Sintow, dir. Humphrey Burton, Covent Garden 1985
Andrea Chenier with José Carreras, Eva Marton, dir. Giuseppe Patanè CBS 1985
La forza del destino with Mirella Freni, Plácido Domingo, Paul Plishka, Sesto Bruscantini, dir. Riccardo Muti EMI 1986
Madama Butterfly (DVD) with Yasuko Hayashi, Peter Dvorsky, dir. Keita Asart Pioneer Artist 1986
Guglielmo Tell with Chris Merritt, Cheryl Studer, Luigi Roni, dir. Riccardo Muti Philips 1988
Rigoletto with Daniela Dessì, Vincenzo La Scola, Paata Burchuladze, dir. Riccardo Muti EMI 1988
I vespri siciliani with Chris Merritt, Cheryl Studer, Ferruccio Furlanetto, dir. Riccardo Muti EMI 1989
Attila (DVD) with Samuel Ramey, Cheryl Studer, Kaludi Kaludov, dir. Riccardo Muti Fonit-Cetra 1991
La traviata (DVD) with Edita Gruberova, Neil Shicoff, dir. Carlo Rizzi Teldec 1992
Tosca with Carol Vaness, Giuseppe Giacomini, dir. Riccardo Muti Philips 1992
Falstaff with Walter Berry, Francisco Araiza, dir. Lorin Maazel Orfeo 2009 (1983 live performance)

General sources
 Le guide de l'opéra, les indispensables de la musique, R. Mancini & J-J. Rouveroux, (Fayard, 1995),

External links 
 

1939 births
Living people
Musicians from Verona
Italian operatic baritones
20th-century Italian male opera singers